Benjamin Lupo (born March 20, 1987), better known as DrLupo, is an American streamer and YouTuber.

Career
Lupo began his career streaming Destiny before transitioning to battle royale games such as H1Z1. His channel grew after he began playing Fortnite. He often streamed with Ninja, Myth and TimTheTatman.

On October 20, 2018, Lupo broke the Fortnite world record for vehicle trick points with a score of 49,256,200 after operating the Quadcrasher.

In 2018, he raised $600,000 for St. Jude Children's Research Hospital. In 2019, he set a goal to raise at least $2 million for the hospital. He ended up beating his goal raising $2.3 million.

In December 2019, Lupo officially signed an exclusive deal with Twitch.

Lupo began playing Escape from Tarkov in 2020. He described the game as "unlike any other game I think right now" and could be played in multiple ways. He said the game was "an absolute blast".

Lupo also plays Fall Guys and has been considered by some to be the best player in the world.

Lupo also participated in an Among Us stream with table people like Alexandria Ocasio-Cortez, Ilhan Omar, and other streaming stars like Pokimane, Disguised Toast, and Myth, as a get out the vote (GOTV) event.

In August 2021, Lupo signed an exclusivity deal with YouTube as a content producer, which ended his around 1 and a half year deal with Twitch.

Awards and nominations

See also
 List of most-followed Twitch channels

References

1987 births
American esports players
Living people
Fortnite
Twitch (service) streamers
American YouTubers
Gaming YouTubers
YouTube streamers